Jacques Claude, comte Beugnot (25 July 1761 – 24 June 1835) was a French politician before, during, and after the French Revolution. His son Auguste Arthur Beugnot was an historian and scholar.

Biography

Revolution
Born at Bar-sur-Aube (Aube), he served as a magistrate under the ancien régime, and was elected deputy to the Legislative Assembly (1791). A Feuillant and later a Girondist, he was proscribed along with the Girondists after François Hanriot's intervention and the trial of October 1793, and was imprisoned in the Conciergerie until the Thermidorian Reaction.

Napoleon
He next entered into relations with the family of Napoleon Bonaparte, and in 1799, after the coup of 18 Brumaire, again entered politics, becoming successively préfet of the Seine-Inférieure département, member of the Conseil d'État, and finance minister to Jérôme Bonaparte, King of Westphalia, during the First French Empire. 

In 1808 Beugnot, who had meanwhile been appointed administrator of the Grand Duchy of Berg-Cleves, received the cross of an Officier de la Légion d'honneur with the title of count. He returned to France in 1813, after the battle of Leipzig, and was made prefect of the département of Nord.

Bourbons
In 1814, he was a member of the provisional government as Minister of the Interior, and rallied to the House of Bourbon. King Louis XVIII named him director-general of police and afterwards Naval Minister. He followed Louis to Ghent during the Hundred Days, became one of his confidants, and contributed to draw up Louis's Charter. He claimed (in his Mémoires) to have also furnished the text of the proclamation addressed by the king to the French people before his return to France - but it is known now that it was another text that was adopted.

After the full Bourbon Restoration, lacking the support of the Ultra-royalists, he was given the title of Minister of State without portfolio, which was equivalent to a retirement. Elected deputy, he attached himself to the moderate party, and defended the liberty of the press. In 1830, he was made a Peer of France by Charles X, and confirmed by Louis-Philippe after the July Revolution, becoming and director-general of manufactures and commerce.

References

Attribution

1761 births
1835 deaths
People from Bar-sur-Aube
Counts of the First French Empire
Girondins
French interior ministers
Ministers of Marine and the Colonies
Members of the Legislative Assembly (France)
Members of the Chamber of Deputies of the Bourbon Restoration
Members of the Chamber of Peers of the July Monarchy
Prefects of France
Prefects of Seine-Maritime
Prefects of Nord (French department)
Prefects of police of Paris
Officiers of the Légion d'honneur
Burials at Père Lachaise Cemetery
French male non-fiction writers
18th-century French memoirists
19th-century French memoirists